William Nyallau Badak (born 22 July 1951) is a Malaysian politician who served as the Member of Parliament (MP) for Lubok Antu from March 2008 to May 2018. He is an independent in support for the ruling Gabungan Parti Sarawak (GPS) coalition and was a member of the opposition Parti Sarawak Bersatu (PSB) and of the Parti Rakyat Sarawak (PRS), a component party of the ruling Barisan Nasional (BN) coalition. He was elected to Parliament in the 2008 election, replacing long-serving incumbent Jawah Gerang. Before entering Parliament, he was a Native Court judge. He joined PSB in 2019 after he was sacked from PRS on 22 April 2018 and dropped as a candidate in the 2018 general election. In 2021 Sarawak state election, he contested for the Batang Ai state seat as a PSB candidate but lost. On 8 November 2022, he left PSB and pledged his support for GPS.

Election results

References

Living people
1951 births
People from Sarawak
Parti Rakyat Sarawak politicians
Members of the Dewan Rakyat